Sweet Spy is a South Korean television series starring Nam Sang-mi, Lee Joo-hyun, Yoo Sun, and Korean-American model-turned-actor Dennis Oh. It aired on MBC from November 7, 2005 to January 10, 2006 on Mondays and Tuesdays at 21:55 for 20 episodes.

Plot
Lee Soon-ae is a recently widowed traffic cop who finds herself in over her head after she stops a man for committing a routine traffic violation. Han Yoo-il, the mysterious and charming stranger who was stopped by the ever-diligent Soon-ae, is in fact an international spy, who has come to Korea on a top-secret mission. When Soon-ae accidentally forgets to return Yoo-il's super high-tech spy pen to him, she sets in motion a chain of events that pulls her into the shady world of international espionage. Soon, the Special Operations Unit also becomes involved, including its new chief Kang Joon, who happens to be an old friend of Soon-ae's late husband. Kang Joon, who secretly harbors feelings for Soon-ae, opens an old case surrounding the death of her husband. They uncover secrets involving powerful political and economic figures, which leads to Han Yoo-il.

Cast
 Nam Sang-mi as Lee Soon-ae
 Dennis Oh as Han Yoo-il
 Lee Joo-hyun as Kang Joon
 Yoo Sun as Park Eun-joo
 Kim Bo-sung as Detective Shim
 Choi Bool-am as Choi Beom-gu
 Lee Ki-yeol as Wang Sa-bal ("Big Bowl")
 Kim Joon-ho as Kaori ("Stingray")
 Kim Ha-kyun as Jo Jung-hae
 Jung Jong-joon as senior policeman Hong
 Ahn Yeon-hong as Oh Na-ra
 Sung Eun as Choi Ji-soo
 Kim Il-woo as Song Hyun-chul
 Gi Ju-bong as Yoo-il's assistant
 Kim Yong-hee as Director Park
 Park Jung-woo as gangster boss
 Yoon Joo-sang as the commanding officer

Ratings

Source: TNmS Media Korea

Accidental nudity 
In the bathhouse scene in episode 3, three male actors – Choi Bool-am, Lee Ki-yeol and Kim Joon-ho—are seen rubbing each other's backs, their private parts decently out of frame. But the genitals of an extra was fully, if dimly, exposed in the background. Viewers protested on the drama's online message board, and the producers immediately posted an apology. MBC re-edited the scene for re-runs.

References

External links 
 Sweet Spy official MBC website 
 Sweet Spy at MBC Global Media
 
 Sweet Spy at KoreanWiz
 

2005 South Korean television series debuts
2006 South Korean television series endings
Korean-language television shows
MBC TV television dramas
South Korean action television series
South Korean romantic comedy television series